Subhash Dutta (9 February 1930 – 16 November 2012) was a Bangladeshi filmmaker, theater and film actor. He started his career as a commercial artist.

Career

At the beginning of his career, Dutta worked as a film poster artist. He drew posters for Mukh O Mukhosh (1956), the first Bengali-language movie to be made in East Pakistan (now Bangladesh). He directed his first movie, Sutorang, in 1964. The movie won the second prize at the Frankfurt Festival in 1965. In 1972, he acted with the theatrical group, Aranyak Nattyadal.

Awards

 Bangladesh National Film Award for Best Director (1976)
 Ekushey Padak (1999) 
 Nigar Award (1962)
His movie Abirbhab won a prestigious award in Frankfurt Film Festival. His directed movies were awarded in Phnom Penh Film Festival (1968), Moscow Film Festival (1967, 1973, 1979). He also got award for his acting by Pakistan Film Festival (1965).

Personal life and death
Dutta had two sons, Shivaji and Ranaji, and two daughters, Shilpi and Shotabdi.

Dutta died from heart disease on 16 November 2012 at his home in Ram Krishna Mission Road, Dhaka.

Filmography
Director

Actor

References

Footnotes

Bibliography

External links
 

2012 deaths
1930 births
People from Dinajpur District, Bangladesh
Pakistani male film actors
Pakistani film directors
Bangladeshi male film actors
Bangladeshi film directors
Bangladeshi Hindus
Recipients of the Ekushey Padak
Nigar Award winners
Best Director National Film Award (Bangladesh) winners
Meril-Prothom Alo Lifetime Achievement Award winners